This is a listing of discography from the Christian rock band BarlowGirl.

Albums

Singles
All singles released prior to "Beautiful Ending" use the Radio & Records (R&R) charts.   R&R was discontinued when "Beautiful Ending" was released, so this single, and those released after it, use the Billboard charts instead.

Videography

Video albums

Music videos

Other

Performance tracks
Unless otherwise indicated, all tracks are available on Daywind and Studio Series.
 "Never Alone" (2005)
 "Mirror" (2005)
 "Enough" (2005)
 "I Need You To Love Me" (2005)
 "For The Beauty of The Earth" (2006, Studio Series only)

In popular media

Video games
BarlowGirl has a total of four songs which appear in Dance Praise rhythm games.  A fifth song, "You're Worthy of My Praise", was sung by Big Daddy Weave and featured BarlowGirl:

Notes

  A music video for an unknown song is mentioned in the How Can We Be Silent All Access Pass.
  A short clip of what is believed to be the "Sweet Revenge" music video was featured in a promotional video.
  A recording session for "Stay With Me" was uploaded on BarlowGirl's YouTube channel. Additionally, Our Journey... So Far shows a photo of Rebecca Barlow in the music video.
  The "Sing Me a Love Song" video montage was prepared by Mercy Ministries.  Apart from the Love & War album art showing up briefly during the second chorus, the band chose to be absent from this video to "keep the focus on the issues presented". The "Sing Me a Love Song" music video can be watched in 720p on YouTube.

References

Discographies of American artists
Pop music group discographies
Christian music discographies